Peck Glacier is an alpine glacier in Roosevelt National Forest in the U.S. state of Colorado.

See also
List of glaciers in the United States

References

Glaciers of Colorado
Landforms of Grand County, Colorado